The 2021 WTA Poland Open (also known as the BNP Paribas Poland Open for sponsorship purposes) was a women's tennis tournament played on outdoor clay courts. It was the first edition of the WTA Poland Open, and part of the WTA 250 series of the 2021 WTA Tour. It was held at the Arka Tennis Club in Gdynia, Poland, from 19 until 25 July 2021.

Finals

Singles 

  Maryna Zanevska def.  Kristína Kučová 6–4, 7–6(7–4)

Doubles 

  Anna Danilina /  Lidziya Marozava def.  Kateryna Bondarenko /  Katarzyna Piter 6–3, 6–2

Singles main draw entrants

Seeds

1 Rankings are as of 12 July 2021.

Other entrants
The following players received wildcards into the main draw:
  Weronika Baszak
  Valeriia Olianovskaia
  Urszula Radwańska
  Katie Volynets 

The following player received entry as a special exempt:
  Maryna Zanevska

The following players received entry from the qualifying draw:
  Anna Bondár
  Kateryna Bondarenko
  Federica Di Sarra
  Ekaterine Gorgodze

The following players received entry as lucky losers:
  Amina Anshba
  Weronika Falkowska
  Jamie Loeb
  Marina Melnikova
  Tereza Mrdeža
  Anastasia Zakharova

Withdrawals
Before the tournament
  Clara Burel → replaced by  Weronika Falkowska
  Harriet Dart → replaced by  Kristína Kučová
  Polona Hercog → replaced by  Kateryna Kozlova
  Anna-Lena Friedsam → replaced by  Viktória Kužmová
  Anhelina Kalinina → replaced by  Anastasia Zakharova
  Tereza Martincová → replaced by  Marina Melnikova
  Anna Kalinskaya → replaced by  Varvara Lepchenko
  Yulia Putintseva → replaced by  Tereza Mrdeža
  Nina Stojanović → replaced by  Nuria Párrizas Díaz
  Stefanie Vögele → replaced by  Amina Anshba
  Tamara Zidanšek → replaced by  Jamie Loeb

Doubles main draw entrants

Seeds

1 Rankings are as of 12 July 2021.

Other entrants
The following pairs received wildcards into the doubles main draw:
  Weronika Baszak /  Varvara Flink
  Weronika Falkowska /  Paula Kania-Choduń

Withdrawals
Before the tournament
  Irina Bara /  Mihaela Buzărnescu → replaced by  Alena Fomina /  Tereza Mrdeža
  Tereza Mihalíková /  Fanny Stollár → replaced by  Ania Hertel /  Martyna Kubka
During the tournament
  Irina Bara /  Varvara Lepchenko

References

External links
 Official website

WTA Poland Open
Orange Warsaw Open
WTA Poland Open
WTA Poland Open